Jang Yeong-cheol (born September 9, 1964) is a South Korean sprint canoer who competed in the mid to late 1980s. At the 1984 Summer Olympics in Los Angeles, he was eliminated in the semifinals of the C-2 500 m event. Four years later in Seoul, Jang was eliminated in the semifinals of the C-1 500 m event and the repechages of the C-1 1000 m event.

External links
Sports-Reference.com profile

1964 births
Canoeists at the 1984 Summer Olympics
Canoeists at the 1988 Summer Olympics
Living people
Olympic canoeists of South Korea
South Korean male canoeists